Saxacalli (also Saxakalli), located on the west bank of the Essequibo River some  south of Parika at . The village was originally an Arawak community, and has existed since the late 17th century.

Its population of about 105 people as of 2012 reflects Guyana's multi-ethnicity. Life in Saxacalli is based on small-scale logging, farming and some tourism, mainly from the use of the Saxacalli beach by day-tour operators. The village is not accessible by road, nor does it have a source of electricity.

Saxacalli is an Arawak word for Kingfisher. Near the village is the Saxacalli Rainforest Centre (SRC), one of the first private nature reserves.

References

External links 
 https://web.archive.org/web/20051029104840/http://www.saxacalli.com/index.html

Populated places in Essequibo Islands-West Demerara